Valentina Gustin (born 20 November 1996) is a Croatian sports shooter. She competed in the women's 10 metre air rifle event at the 2016 Summer Olympics.

References

External links
 

1996 births
Living people
Croatian female sport shooters
Olympic shooters of Croatia
Shooters at the 2016 Summer Olympics
Place of birth missing (living people)
21st-century Croatian women